Kenneth Leung (born January 21, 1970) is an American actor. His roles include Sang in Rush Hour, Miles Straume in Lost, Admiral Statura in Star Wars: The Force Awakens, and Eric Tao in HBO's Industry.

Early life
Leung was born in New York City, to Chinese parents, and was initially raised in the Two Bridges section of the Lower East Side of Manhattan. His family moved to Midwood, Brooklyn, where he grew up before finishing high school in Old Bridge, New Jersey.

Leung attended New York University as a University Scholar. He discovered acting in his junior year, studying with Catherine Russell and Nan Smithner, and then briefly with Anne Jackson at HB Studio. During this time he acted mostly in downtown spaces and black box theaters, working with groups such as Ma-Yi Theater Company, New Perspectives, and STAR, a troupe of actors-educators based at Mount Sinai Hospital.

Career
In 1998, Leung made his debut as the villainous henchman Sang opposite Jackie Chan and Chris Tucker in Brett Ratner's Rush Hour. Ratner stated, "[Leung]'s a great actor. In my opinion, he's equivalent to Philip Seymour Hoffman as far as talent is concerned." He would later work with Ratner in the films Red Dragon, The Family Man, and X-Men: The Last Stand. Edward Norton cast Leung in his directorial debut Keeping the Faith in 2000. According to The Washington Post, Norton said Leung's "showstopping performance...turned a throwaway scene into one of the film's best." Impressed with his acting skills, Norton said that Leung would be appropriate for a role in Hamlet or Osborne's Look Back in Anger: "You sense hidden levels within him and he conveys an intensity of mind. I don't think anybody's tapped his full range yet." Additionally, Leung has appeared in several independent and television films, as well as features, including four films with Brett Ratner and two with Spike Lee. In 1998, he played James the Less and God in Terrence McNally's passion play, Corpus Christi, and in 2002 made his Broadway debut in the musical Thoroughly Modern Millie, also appearing on the cast recording.

In 2007, he starred in the independent film Shanghai Kiss with Hayden Panettiere, and earned a Special Mention at the San Francisco International Asian American Film Festival. That same year he guest-starred in the final season of the HBO drama series The Sopranos. He followed this with the ABC drama Lost as Miles Straume from the series' fourth season through the rest of its run.

Filmography

Film

Television

References

External links

Interviews
Asia Pacific Arts - UCLA Asia Institute, May 30, 2008
 Hillis, Aaron. "Interview: Ken Leung on 'Year of the Fish'", IFC.com, August 27, 2008

1970 births
20th-century American male actors
21st-century American male actors
Male actors from New York City
Male actors from New Jersey
American male film actors
American male musical theatre actors
American male television actors
American male actors of Chinese descent
Living people
New York University alumni
People from the Lower East Side
People from Old Bridge Township, New Jersey
Musicians from Brooklyn
People from Midwood, Brooklyn